Curtis Rivers (born 1970) is a British stuntman, stunt coordinator, author, inspirational speaker, and World Record holder.

Stunts
Rivers has performed stunts in films such as James Bond, Fury, Thor: The Dark World, Captain America: The First Avenger, Snow White and the Huntsman, Sherlock Holmes: A Game of Shadows, Robin Hood, The Sands of Time, The Wolfman, St Trinian's / St Trinian's 2: The Legend of Fritton's Gold, National Treasure: Book of Secrets and The Da Vinci Code.

In movies, Rivers has been a stunt double for Christopher Lee, James Caviezel, Rupert Everett, Mark Strong, Hugo Weaving, Jim Broadbent, Matthew MacFadyen, Patrick Bergin, Martin Kemp, Jimmy Nail, Graham McTavish, and Sam Douglas.

In television, he has been a stunt double for Martin Clunes, Trevor Eve, Stephen Tompkinson, Malcolm Sinclair, James Purefoy, Charlie Cox, Tim Dutton, Nick Brimble, Peter Marinker, and Mark Charnock.

He also doubled for John Barrowman for the first 3 seasons of Torchwood, as well as in Doctor Who, falling backwards 140 ft from the British Gas Building in Cardiff for the first episode of Season 2 – "Kiss Kiss, Bang Bang".

As well as working as a stunt coordinator, Rivers also works as a Second Unit Director.

He has also performed stunts in the hit HBO series Game of Thrones, in which he received the 2015 Screen Actors Guild Award for Outstanding Performance by a Stunt Ensemble in a Television Series.

Writing
He is the author of two books – Seven Paths to Freedom, and The Fearless Path. Both works are self-help books, written to create a positive mindset in their readers. Each book received 100% five star reviews, with The Fearless Path becoming an Amazon Bestseller in the Guru Chart in December 2017. The Fearless Path went on to receive numerous literary awards like ‘Body Mind Spirit Book Awards’ (1st place) in April 2018, ‘International Publishing Awards (2 x Gold Medal Winner in both the Personal Growth category and the Body / Mind / Spirit category) in September 2018, and the ‘Readers Favorite Award’ in November 2018, which he received in Miami, Florida.

Rivers also works as a motivational speaker, drawing on experiences in the film and TV industries, his two self-help books, and his two Guinness World Records.

In 2002, he broke world records in parachuting (Longest Parachute Jump) and bungee jumping (Highest Bungee Jump). Both world records required special thermal clothing to cope with the severe sub-zero temperatures at such altitudes.

References

British stunt performers
Living people
1970 births
English male film actors
English male television actors
English motivational speakers
English motivational writers
Bungee jumpers